Jens Lien (born 14 September 1967) is a Norwegian film director. He graduated from the London International Film School in 1993. His graduation project was the short film Montana, that was featured at the short film festival in Grimstad that year. in 1995 he again participated in this festival, with the entry Mitt elektriske kjøkken (My Electrical Kitchen). Lien went on to make the short films  (Shut the Door, 2000) and Naturlige Briller (Natural Glasses, 2001). Both of these films were based on scripts by Per Schreiner, and both were featured at the Cannes International Film Festival. In addition to this Lien has also made a number of advertisements.

In 2003 he had his feature film debut with the movie Jonny Vang.  The movie was selected for the Berlin Film Festival. The movie was awarded an Amanda Award for "Best Actor" (Aksel Hennie) in 2003. It was also nominated in the category "Best Film", but lost out to Bent Hamer's Salmer fra kjøkkenet.

Lien's next major film project was Den brysomme mannen (The Bothersome Man) (2006). This film was again the result of a cooperation with Per Schreiner; it was based on a story originally written for radio theatre, recorded two years before it was adapted for the screen. Lien later said in an interview that the script made such a great impression on him that he was unable to sleep after first reading it. The film was awarded three Amandas in 2006: for "Best Direction", "Best Screenplay" and "Best Actor" (Trond Fausa Aurvåg). It was also nominated in the categories "Best Film" and "Best Actress" (Petronella Barker). Den brysomme mannen has won more than 20 international awards, including the ACID Award (Agence du Cinéma Indépendant pour sa Diffusion) at the Cannes Film Festival.

In 2011 his next feature film Sønner av Norge (Sons of Norway) premiered at the Toronto Film Festival. The film features a cameo performance by John Lydon (aka Johnny Rotten). It premiered in Norway at the same time.

In 2014 he directed the mini series Viva hate for SVT (Swedish television). The series was three 60-minute episodes, and was a romantic comedy about rock 'n' roll set in Gothenburg's vital music scene in the early 1990s.

References

External links

1967 births
Living people
Norwegian film directors